Urs Fankhauser (3 August 1943 – 10 January 2018) was a Swiss rower. He competed at the 1968 Summer Olympics and the 1972 Summer Olympics.

References

1943 births
2018 deaths
Swiss male rowers
Olympic rowers of Switzerland
Rowers at the 1968 Summer Olympics
Rowers at the 1972 Summer Olympics